Diego Javier Llorente Ríos (born 16 August 1993) is a Spanish professional footballer who plays as a centre-back for  club Roma, on loan from Premier League club Leeds United, and the Spain national team.

Having been developed at Real Madrid, who also loaned him twice to clubs in La Liga, Llorente signed with Real Sociedad in June 2017. Three years later, he joined Leeds United.

Llorente made his full debut for Spain in 2016. He was part of the squad at Euro 2020.

Club career

Real Madrid
Born in Madrid, Llorente joined Real Madrid's youth system in July 2002, one month shy of his ninth birthday. In the 2012–13 season he made his senior debut, appearing with the C team in a 1–1 away draw against Caudal Deportivo in the Segunda División B.

On 24 March 2013, Llorente made his first appearance with Real Madrid Castilla, coming on as a substitute for injured Iván González in an eventual 4–0 home win over Córdoba CF. On 11 May, he was an unused bench player for the main squad in a La Liga match at RCD Espanyol, but finally made his debut in the competition on 1 June, replacing Álvaro Arbeloa for the dying minutes of the last game of the campaign, at home against CA Osasuna.

On 14 July 2015, Llorente moved to neighbouring Rayo Vallecano in a season-long loan deal. He scored his first goal in the top flight on 3 January 2016, the first in a 2–2 home draw against Real Sociedad, and was an undisputed starter as his team eventually suffered relegation as third from bottom.

Llorente was loaned to Málaga CF also in the top tier on 8 July 2016.

Real Sociedad
On 26 June 2017, Llorente signed a five-year contract with fellow league team Real Sociedad. In his league debut, on 10 September, he contributed one goal to a 4–2 away win against Deportivo de La Coruña after replacing Iñigo Martínez midway through the second half. Four days later, in his very first appearance in European competition, he started and scored twice in a 4–0 home defeat of Rosenborg BK in the group stage of the UEFA Europa League.

Leeds United
Leeds United announced the signing of Llorente on a four-year deal on 24 September 2020, for a reported fee of £18 million. He made his Premier League debut on 5 December, coming on for the injured Robin Koch in the ninth minute of an eventual 3–1 away loss to rivals Chelsea. He scored his first league goal on 19 April 2021, heading home a cross from Jack Harrison in a 1–1 home draw against Liverpool.

On 31 January 2023, Llorente joined Serie A club A.S. Roma on loan until 30 June with an option to buy.

International career
In May 2016, Llorente was called up to the Spain national team by manager Vicente del Bosque for a friendly against Bosnia and Herzegovina. He made his debut later in the month, replacing Cesc Fàbregas in the 3–1 win in Switzerland.

On 24 May 2021, Llorente was included in Luis Enrique's 24-man squad for UEFA Euro 2020.

Style of play
A right-footed player who possesses good positioning and is strong in the air, Llorente can operate as a central defender or defensive midfielder.

Career statistics

Club

International

References

External links

1993 births
Living people
Spanish footballers
Footballers from Madrid
Association football defenders
La Liga players
Segunda División players
Segunda División B players
Real Madrid C footballers
Real Madrid Castilla footballers
Real Madrid CF players
Rayo Vallecano players
Málaga CF players
Real Sociedad footballers
Premier League players
Leeds United F.C. players
Serie A players
A.S. Roma players
Spain youth international footballers
Spain international footballers
UEFA Euro 2020 players
Spanish expatriate footballers
Expatriate footballers in England
Expatriate footballers in Italy
Spanish expatriate sportspeople in England
Spanish expatriate sportspeople in Italy